Marvin Leon Warner (June 8, 1919 in Birmingham, Alabama – April 8, 2002 in Cape Canaveral, Florida) was the United States Ambassador to Switzerland and Liechtenstein from 1977 until 1979 (some sources say until 1981) and the owner of the Birmingham Stallions. He was the owner of Home State Savings Bank, breeder of thoroughbred horses, part owner of the New York Yankees from 1973 until 1975 as well as the Tampa Bay Buccaneers.

Warner was “sentenced ... to 3 1/2 years in prison and fined $22 million for helping trigger the biggest banking crisis in Ohio history.”  Unable to post the $22 million cash bond ordered by the judge, Warner was immediately taken to jail.  When he was released from prison, he moved to an Ocala, Florida horse farm to protect himself from creditors. Those were state charges. He was found innocent on an 18 count indictment on federal charges of one count of conspiracy, 15 counts of wire fraud and two counts of interstate movement of fraudulently obtained funds for which the maximum combined penalty was 90 years.

Biography
Born and raised in Birmingham, he served in the army in World War Two, leaving with the rank of captain. He earned both an undergraduate degree and law degree from the University of Alabama.

Warner died of a heart attack while in Cape Canaveral to watch the launch of the space shuttle Atlantis.

Warner was married three times.  All three marriages ended in divorce.  

Warner married Jane Marie Blach (1923–2002) in Memphis, Tennessee, in October 1942. Blach's family owned a department store in Birmingham.  Warner and Blach had three children: Marvin Jr., Marlin, and Alyson.  They divorced in June 1967. Blach that same year married Dr. Albert Sabin, inventor of the oral polio vaccine.

Warner on May 27, 1979, married Susan Lee Gherman (born 1947), daughter of Dr. E. Mortimer and Irene Gherman of Newport Beach, California.  The wedding came twelve days after her divorce from Congressman Barry M. Goldwater, Jr. They filed for divorce the next year. In 2017, she married Bob Wright, the former head of NBC.

His third wife was Josephine Louise "Jody" Piehowicz (born 1956).  Piehowicz, who grew up in St. Clairsville, Ohio, was an attorney who worked for Vern Riffe, speaker of the Ohio House of Representatives.  They married September 2, 1984.

References

Ambassadors of the United States to Switzerland
Ambassadors of the United States to Liechtenstein
1919 births
2002 deaths
University of Alabama School of Law alumni
Savings and loan crisis
New York Yankees owners
Tampa Bay Buccaneers owners